The IFFI Award for Best Actress (officially known as the Silver Peacock for the Best Actor Award (Female)) is an honor presented annually at the International Film Festival of India since 2010 to an actress for the best performance in a leading role in World cinema. Earlier the award was presented on various occasions at the 3rd IFFI for ensemble cast in "Nirjan Saikate", and Brazilian actress Fernanda Torres at 11th IFFI.

List of award winners

References

 
Lists of Indian award winners
International Film Festival of India
Indian film festivals
Festivals in Goa
Film awards for lead actress
Indian film awards